Hollis Stacy (born March 16, 1954) is an American professional golfer. She became a member of the LPGA Tour in 1974, winning four major championships and 18 LPGA Tour events. She was inducted into the World Golf Hall of Fame in the veterans category in 2012.

Amateur career
Born and raised in Savannah, Georgia, Stacy won the U.S. Girls' Junior three consecutive times, the only player to accomplish this feat, in 1969, 1970, and 1971. In 1970, she won the North and South Women's Amateur at Pinehurst, and played for the 1972 United States Curtis Cup team. She attended Rollins College in Winter Park, Florida and became a member of the LPGA Tour in 1974.

Professional career
Stacy won four major championships during her career: the U.S. Women's Open in 1977, 1978, and 1984, and the 1983 Peter Jackson Classic (later known as the du Maurier Classic). She had 18 LPGA wins; the last win came in 1991 at the Crestar-Farm Fresh Classic. She played on the LPGA Tour through 2000, then became eligible to join the newly founded Women's Senior Golf Tour (now Legends Tour) in 2001. She won the Shopko Great Lakes Classic in 2001.

Amateur wins
1969 U.S. Girls' Junior
1970 U.S. Girls' Junior, North and South Women's Amateur
1971 U.S. Girls' Junior

Professional wins

LPGA Tour wins (18)

LPGA Tour playoff record (6–4)

LPGA of Japan Tour wins (1)
1984 Nichirei Cup Japan-US Women's Professional Golf Team Championship

Legends Tour wins (1)
2001 Shopko Great Lakes Classic

Other wins
1977 Pepsi-Cola Mixed Team Championship (with Jerry Pate)

Major championships

Wins (4)

Results timeline

CUT = missed the half-way cut
"T" = tied

Summary
Starts – 96
Wins – 4
2nd-place finishes – 1
3rd-place finishes – 0
Top 3 finishes – 5
Top 5 finishes – 7
Top 10 finishes – 16
Top 25 finishes – 37
Missed cuts – 28
Most consecutive cuts made – 25
Longest streak of top-10s – 3 (twice)

Team appearances
Amateur
Curtis Cup (representing the United States): 1972 (winners)

See also
List of golfers with most LPGA Tour wins
List of golfers with most LPGA major championship wins

References

External links

American female golfers
Rollins Tars women's golfers
LPGA Tour golfers
Winners of LPGA major golf championships
World Golf Hall of Fame inductees
Golfers from Denver
Golfers from Savannah, Georgia
1954 births
Living people